Dead Man's Plack is a Grade-II listed 19th-century monument to Æthelwald, Ealdorman of East Anglia, who, according to legend, was killed in 963 near the site where it stands by his rival in love, King Edgar I. The name is more probably derived from a corruption of "Dudman's Platt", from Dudman — who is recorded as a resident in 1735 — and platt, meaning a plot of land. The monument was erected in 1825 at Harewood Forest, between the villages of Picket Twenty and Longparish, Hampshire, by Lt. Col. William Iremonger.

Description
The monument consists of a stone cross on a pedestal with plain unmoulded details. On its south side an inscription in Gothic script reads:
 
An inscription on the north side of the plinth reads: "This Monument was erected by Col William Iremonger AD MDCCCXXV".

Legend

According to legend, King Edgar I sent his "favourite and most trusted" earl, Æthelwald, to meet Ælfthryth, daughter of Ordgar, the Earl of Devonshire, to assess her suitability as a bride. On meeting her, Æthelwald was "smitten with her beauty" and married her himself. Æthelwald then returned to the king and told him that she was "a girl of vulgar and common place appearance, and by no means worthy" of the king's hand, while concealing his own marriage to her. Discovering the deception through court gossip, Edgar swore vengeance and arranged a hunt in the Harewood Forest to which he invited Æthelwald. During the hunt, Edgar murdered Æthelwald with a javelin, and subsequently took Ælfthryth as his wife and queen.

Historical basis
The story of Æthelwald's murder was first described by William of Malmesbury, a 12th-century historian, in his Gesta regum Anglorum ("Deeds of the kings of the English"; 1125). William's account was later repeated by David Hume (1711–1776), a Scottish historian, philosopher, economist, diplomat and essayist, in his 6-volume work The History of England, published between 1754–1761. Thomas Babington Macaulay (1800–1859), in his preface to Lays of Ancient Rome (1842), says the story has "a most suspicious air of romance" and "greatly resembles" some of the legends of early Rome. Macaulay writes: "when we turn to William of Malmesbury, we find that Hume, in his eagerness to relate these pleasant fables, has overlooked one very important circumstance. William does indeed tell both the stories; but he gives us distinct notice that he does not warrant their truth, and that they rest on no better authority than that of ballads."

Edward Augustus Freeman (1823–1892) debunks the story as a "tissue of romance" in his 1875 Historic Essays and writes: "The process by which legend gets transmuted into apparent history could not have been better described than it is by Lord Macaulay." Freeman also refers to another contemporary chronicler, Geoffrey Gaimar, whose  ("History of the English People"; 1136–1140) describes Æthelwald's death at the hands of unidentified armed men in Wherwell Forest (Harewood Forest).

Elizabeth Norton, a historian specialising in the queens of England, concludes that "the evidence certainly does not suggest that [Æthelwald] was murdered" and that the story related by William of Malmesbury is "a later elaboration" of the reason behind Ælfthryth's foundation of nearby Wherwell Abbey, "which was popularly considered to have been carried out as an act of atonement."

Dudman's Platt
Writing in 2004, historian John Spaul suggests that the name and position of the monument came about as a mistaken derivative of the location's name, "Dudman's Platt". Dudman is recorded as a resident in 1735 and "platt" referred to a "plot of land". Spaul explains: "The legend of Edgar and Ælfthryth as fabricated by romantic poets in the 12th century and related by William of Malmesbury, gave an excuse for Colonel Iremonger, a 19th-century antiquarian, to erect a monument in his part of Harewood Forest. He probably thought he had found evidence of the romantic tale because of the name Dudman's Platt which could be the local pronunciation of Dead Man's Place."

In popular culture
The story of Æthelwald's murder was revived by William Henry Hudson (1841 – 1922), a naturalist who, "fascinated like many before and after by this monument", published a romantic version of the legend in his Dead Man's Plack and an Old Thorn (1920). Hudson, who stated that he disliked Freeman "because he was so infernally cock-sure, so convinced that he and he alone had the power of distinguishing between the true and false", also went to some lengths to discredit the historian's dismissal of the story as untrue.

The story is also the subject of The King's Henchman, an opera in three acts composed by Deems Taylor to an English language libretto by Edna St. Vincent Millay. It premiered on 17 February 1927 at the Metropolitan Opera in New York City in a performance conducted by Tullio Serafin. On 18 September 1927 it became the first live opera to be broadcast on CBS Radio when it was performed in a condensed version narrated by the composer. Despite its great success at the time, The King's Henchman soon fell out of the repertory and is now all but forgotten.

References 

Buildings and structures completed in 1825
Grade II listed buildings in Hampshire
Monuments and memorials in Hampshire
Cross symbols